Bert "Yank" Levy (October 5, 1897September 2, 1965) was a Canadian soldier, socialist, military instructor and author/pamphleteer of one of the first manuals on guerrilla warfare, which was widely circulated with more than a half million published. He served with irregular forces in several parts of the world in the 1920s and 1930s, most notably in the Spanish Civil War, and was a significant figure at the Osterley Park training school for the British Home Guard during World War II.  Similar combat training was provided to forces in the United States and Canada, and he was an itinerant lecturer and provocateur on the subject.

Background 
Levy was born in Hamilton, Canada to a Jewish family. His family moved to Buffalo, New York when he was three months old, and then to Cleveland, Ohio when he was seven years old. His parents were Samuel Levy, a tailor and "horse doctor", and Sarah Pollock. Bert Levy had nine siblings. To counter a frail constitution, Levy became a Boy Scout and a boxer.  He grew up on the streets and stated that his "real education was in the school of hard knocks".  At age 16, he quit school after his father was seriously injured by a trolley. He took employment with the Kaber Printing Company in Cleveland for four years to help support his younger siblings.

In 1916, he joined the British Merchant Navy working as a stoker. In the spring of 1918, Levy enlisted in the 39th Battalion, Royal Fusiliers (part of the Jewish Legion). Levy continued boxing through World War I and was the regimental bantamweight champion. After returning to Cleveland from the war, he briefly turned professional. He fought in 23 matches before retiring "in order to maintain family harmony".

He married Mary Prezenter, who was a clerk.  They had one daughter.  He was a pipe smoker, and played the mandolin.

In 1927 Levy was arrested along with four other men and a woman for a series of robberies. During a search, police discovered a cache of guns. He was convicted of the January 1927 armed robbery of a Philadelphia A&P food market. Though this was Levy's first criminal conviction, Judge Harry McDevitt imposed a severe sentence of 2550 years. After serving six years, in 1933 he was released and deported to Canada (he was presumed to be a Canadian citizen at the time).

Military career

Field service 
He served in five wars  many of the wars and insurrections between 1911 and 1945.  Trying to find the truth of Levy's exploits is problematic, as Levy tended to embellish his biography.

From 1918 to 1919 Levy served with the 39th Battalion, Royal Fusiliers (part of the Jewish Legion) in Palestine and Transjordan. That tour ended when he was gassed and contracted malaria. He trained in Nova Scotia, England, and Egypt, and was dispatched as a machine gunner.  In September 1918 his unit moved through the Egyptian desert. The unit entered the Jordan River valley, taking control of Es-Salt in a campaign against the Turks. With two other members of the 39th Battalion, he encountered scouts of Colonel T. E. Lawrence.  The scouts invited them to tea, and told them stories of amazing feats, and "Levy decided on a lifelong career in guerrilla warfare."
In 1920–21, he was, in his own (attributed) words "mixed up in Mexico" towards the end of  the revolution there.  Subsequently, he was involved in gun-running in Nicaragua, where he served under General Sandino.  In Nicaragua, he outfitted a ship with sandbagged Lewis gun "emplacements in case of a surprise en route by U.S. patrol vessels."  His service with the Sandinistas was cut short when the United States and U.S. Marines appeared, as "he had no desire to fight his fellow countrymen."  Another scenario is that the Sandinistas deemed the continued reliability of Americans to be dubious as a force opposing the Marines, and they were involuntarily retired.

In 1921 Levy was employed to train Mexicans in the use of the Lewis gun. He left after 6 months when some trainees used their guns on prisoners. Levy also claimed to have participated in "troubles" in countries to the south of Mexico, and to have been sentenced to thirty years imprisonment for gun running. The Levys were now broke, and living in marital discord.

During the Spanish Civil War Levy served with the International Brigade as an officer in the British Battalion, under Tom Wintringham, from 1937.  The brigade fought against the rightist Falangists. He was captured at the Battle of Jarama where he had manned a heavy machine gun. He was captured on the second day and there is a photo of him and other British machine gunners in the custody of the Guardia Civil. He spent six months in a Francoist gaol. A protest from the Canadian government led to Levy's release in a prisoner exchange for two Italian officers  something he characterized as "a fair deal." Even after all that, he still had to be prevented by friends from re-enlisting and returning to the fray. Upon his release, he went back to Canada and personally recruited 1,200 volunteers for the Republican cause.

In 1940, with the outbreak of World War II he tried to enlist with the Canadian Army, but was refused on medical grounds.  "He volunteered to join the Canadian Army as soon as this war broke out, and was turned down for flat feet or hammer toes  or perhaps, more seriously, for his reputation as one of the most obstreperous leaders of Canada's unemployed."

Training officer and consultant

United Kingdom 
Following this refusal, Levy worked his passage to Britain as a stoker on a steamer.  After arriving in the United Kingdom, he rejoined Wintringham and other International Brigade veterans.
Levy worked alongside these other veterans on Home Guard training, and was involved in the establishment of an unofficial training school for the Home Guard at Osterley Park.  The school was funded in part by Wendell Endicott (shoe magnate of Endicott-Johnson Shoes), a Home Guard  and Levy's lectures were well received.  Nazi propagandist Lord Haw-Haw dubbed the Osterley trainees to be "Osterley cut throats" because of their hardened approach to guerrilla warfare.  This was "Home Guard School #1."  Although the school became famous through its appearance in newsreels and newspaper articles around the world (particularly in the US), the socialism espoused by the school's instructors met with disapproval by the War Office (WO) and Winston Churchill, and it was taken over by the WO in September 1940. Closed in 1941, its staff and courses were reallocated to other newly opened WO-approved Home Guard schools.

While lecturing there Wintringham helped Levy write his book  described by some as a "war pamphlet"  Guerrilla Warfare as a practical manual. It originated in the lectures given at Osterley Park, and had much to say about close quarters combat. This was published in mass market paperback in Britain and the U.S. and ran to several editions.  Levy advocated guerrilla warfare as a democratic means of combating fascism, frequently attacking the military establishment who overlooked the lessons born of such commanders as T. E. Lawrence and their experience in irregular war.  He also recounts some of his adventures as a guerrilla, such as the time he and his companions trapped cats' tails in mouse traps as a means of distracting sentries.  Wintringham said that Levy was the most effective communicator in Great Britain on the tactics of commando and guerrilla warfare.  His primary lecture subject was knife fighting and hand-to-hand combat.

"Yank" Levy was not just a soldier and an efficient killer, but was a committed Socialist with a socialist's set of values and approach, which influenced his analysis and his goals and presentations. It wasn't just all technical stuff, but was an attempt to incite the local populace to provide for the common defense.  Thus, there was an attempt to harness "the enduring patriotism of the population." Metaphors were made of Home Guard guerrilla defence against Adolf Hitler to historical antecedents, such as Hereward the Wake resistance to the 'heavily armoured forces' of William the Conqueror.  Levy admitted that Hereward was not triumphant.  Seeking to mobilize popular sentiment, he urged readers to look at the Arab Revolt and Orde Wingate's part in organising 'Jewish irregulars in Palestine'.  He counseled that reading fictional accounts of guerrilla warfare would provide guidance, including those describing campaigns in Ireland, Spain and China, such as: Ernie O'Malley's On Another Man's Wound; Ernest Hemingway's For Whom the Bell Tolls; and Edgar Snow's Scorched Earth, respectively.

The book had significant impact and it received favorable press. Time magazine wrote:
Anyone who thinks his country will be invaded  which includes anyone now alive  would do well to read "Yank" Levi's Guerrilla Warfare for instruction on to harass invaders.

Time enthusiastically noted his unconventional approach:
Sinister Shadow. . . . The Methods of ambush are important. A wire cable strung across a road at an angle will slide a motorcycle off into the ditch, where the cyclist can be slugged and searched . . . Destruction is one aim. A guerrilla learns how to derail and wreck trains, blow up tanks, destroy planes on the ground, dynamite bridges. In taking sentries, advises Mr. Levy, the back is the best approach. If that is not possible, the guerrilla covers the sentry with his revolver, steps on his foot, unbuttons his tunic and jerks it down over his arms to lock them. "You may slap his ears with the revolver barrel, to intimidate him. . . . You should also drop his trousers to lock his feet." . . . Besides blankets, extra socks, binoculars, rifles, burnt cork to blacken the face, etc., an important part of the equipment is 25 to 30 yards of fishline. . . .  [and] booby traps.

They believed that well-trained irregulars could undermine tanks and the Blitzkrieg. As Wintringham noted:
The guerrilla, on the other hand, can exert against the communications of any enemy force, against his dumps as well as his lorries his headquarters as well as his stragglers, a continual pressure a threat that wears out men and forces. And guerrilla warfare is a method of fighting  a useful method, that will, I believe, in future campaigns become absolutely essential to success—that can be achieved and developed by democracies and by socialist societies, but cannot be developed by Fascism, particularly in the areas where Fascism rules by force against the will of the population.

Successful guerrilla fighting needs the self-confidence and initiative of millions of free men, the support at risk and at heavy sacrifice of almost all the population, and a feeling of close comradeship and solidarity between the guerrilla troops and any regular army and air force supporting them. The Nazis cannot get these qualities at their service, in any of the occupied countries of Europe, even in Italy. We can. And therefore we should not think of guerrilla warfare only in terms of the present heroism of the Soviet Union, or a possible future resistance to invasion in this country. We should think of it also in terms of our own invasion of the Continent. We should be looking for ways of fighting, and combinations between ways of fighting that can enable a democratic force invading Hitler's Europe to mobilize and use the enormous power of the "hundred million allies" who can be ours.

That the handbook was available for 1725¢ per copy was a factor in its being widely circulated.  Over a half million copies were printed.

United States 
Despite having been deported from the United States in 1933, his proficiency caused the United States to take him back so he could train soldiers at the request  of Secretary of State Cordell Hull.   Under the direction of General Sherman Miles, who was commanding the First Corps, Levy taught 30 Regular Army and 76 National Guard soldiers, training them to act as partisans in Concord, Massachusetts. The location, "by the rude bridge that arched the flood", was not accidental but was intended to be a call to arms and to invoke the mystique of the Minutemen.  He was the first instructor at the school.   The mantra was that an indigenous civilian population could rise up and skillfully harass, destroy, debilitate, resist and kill an occupying enemy  this was counter to the conventional wisdom, as guerrilla warfare was deemed unclean and harsh at the time.  There would be no adherence to the Marquess of Queensberry Rules.  He was trying to impart the methods he taught to the Home Guard, while preaching the scorched earth policies that had been ordered by Josef Stalin to thwart the Nazis who were invading the Soviet Union.  Homeland defense was to be an opportunistic counterpunch.  The Soviets had demonstrated that partisans could attack enemy logistics and lines of communication, thereby disrupting the onslaught of mechanized warfare.  As he later told spectators at Harvard University: "Invisibility is better than protection and intimate knowledge of terrain is most important. Utilizing this knowledge of the countryside and employing guerilla tactics, units of the Home Guard have defeated troops of the Regular Army in war games in Britain. With such units in every town and hamlet, the English people form a widespread web to trap an invader from any direction."

Canada 
Throughout World War II, he continued to proselytize the need for a home guard in America, Canada and Great Britain, and to teach that guerrilla warfare was a key ingredient of an effective defense.  He taught the Pacific Coast Militia Rangers in Canada, as it was felt that they needed more than home grown expertise.

He was a trainer of forces at Nanaimo, Vancouver Island that were going to invade the Aleutian Islands in Operation Cottage.

World War II: later years 
In 1943 Levy designed a combat knife, which he unsuccessfully tried to patent and market through the cutlers W. R. Case & Sons.

Subsequently, he returned to lecture in America as an advance party when Wintringham was invited to start an Osterley style school in San Bernardino.  The school was abandoned when the two local Home Guard commanders shot each other during an argument.  Levy gave a successful US lecture tour and had his face pictured on the cover of Life Magazine proclaiming him to be an: Ace Guerrilla, and having a multipage story titled How to be a Guerrilla. Later, he returned to the UK to form part of Wintringham's occasional 'flying squads'  mobile training units which toured provincial Home Guard units in temporary, often unofficial, training camps.

After appearing at Harvard University, where he was billed as an "Instructor in "cad warfare" for the British Commandos, Bert "Yank" Levy, veteran of every war or revolution since 1911, spoke on his work to a mixed gathering of the Naval Supply Corps, Harvard ROTC, and students on Monday in the Stadium." He particularly emphasized the need for individual civilian warfare. He lectured on the Home Guard and the tactics of insurgency.  The Harvard Crimson noted: ""Yank" expects to leave this country within a few days to return to Britain, where Goebbels has promised that he will be among the first to be shot when the Germans capture England."

The United States Infantry Journal called him the greatest instructor on defensive fighting. His life story was illustrated in a comic book entitled Jewish War Heroes, published by the Canadian Jewish Congress in January 1944.

His approach to asymmetrical warfare was seen by some as an unfortunate portent of post-World War II conflicts.

Postwar career and legacy 
In 1946, he sought to go to Palestine, and filed a passport request with the U.S. federal government.  His request was denied ostensibly because of potential diplomatic problems associated with his championing guerrilla warfare and "dirty tricks" that he taught to the Home Guard.

On April 15, 1954, he was pardoned by Pennsylvania Governor John S. Fine for the 1927 conviction for armed robbery.  He had served six years of a 2550 year sentence, before being deported to Canada.  He thereafter learned that he was by birth an American citizen, and that the deportation was illegal.  His lawyer invoked Levy's chronic arthritis and penury, his law-abiding conduct with his wife and daughter in Los Angeles, and his list of good works in helping the war effort.  The petition for executive clemency was approved by the state parole board, and then the governor.  He was represented by Hanley Rubensohn, a Philadelphia attorney, who said that Levy only wanted to wipe out the one blot on his record, so that he could live in peace.  At the time of his pardon, Levy was in hospital. Medical expenses had dissipated his earnings from lectures and book sales.  His attorney for the pardon proceeding believed that Levy had been punished enough.

Levy suffered a heart attack in 1965 that led to his death and the derailment of a planned biography, based on his memorabilia and correspondence, with writer Don Dwiggins; as of 2014, this source material survived in Los Angeles. In 2006 it was announced that an American writer, Todd Winer, was conducting research for a biography "which promises to be fascinating reading, with Levy as a latter day Stephen Crane or Jack London." Levy's reputation continues to depend on his World War II textbook. Levy was also covered in Liberty Magazine, November 21, 1942; American Rifleman, May 1942; Coronet, October 1942; and The Christian Science Monitor, June 17, 1942.  The New York Times also carried an obituary on September 5, 1965.  In 1965, researcher and author Robert Emmett Johnson corresponded with Levy about the latter's involvement in Nicaragua.

Published works 
Guerrilla Warfare
1942 | Penguin Special 102. Introduction by Tom Wintringham. Harmondsworth: Penguin. .
1942 | Full text.  Melbourne: Lothian Publishing.
1964 | Boulder: Panther Publications. .
1964 | Full text. Introduction by Franklin Mark Osanka and "Editor's Notes" by Robert K. Brown. Boulder: Paladin Press. .
1968 | Arabic edition translated by Sami Kaaki. Beirut: House of Science for Millions / Dar Al-Adab.
2008 | "An Infantry Journal Penguin Special." London: Penguin. .

See also 
Guerrilla Warfare by Che Guevara
History of guerrilla warfare
International Brigades order of battle
Jewish Legion
Jewish volunteers in the Spanish Civil War
On Guerrilla Warfare by Mao Zedong

References 
Notes

Citations

Further reading

External links 

1897 births
1965 deaths
Canadian military personnel from Ontario
Canadian military personnel of World War I
People of the Mexican Revolution
People of the Banana Wars
Canadian people of the Spanish Civil War
Spanish Civil War prisoners of war
Guerrillas
Guerrilla warfare theorists
Canadian military historians
Canadian male non-fiction writers
Jews in Mandatory Palestine
Royal Fusiliers soldiers
British Army personnel of World War I
Jewish Canadian writers
International Brigades personnel
Jewish socialists
Jewish anti-fascists
Jewish Legion